Raat in Hindi or Raatri in Telugu is a 1992 Indian supernatural horror film written and directed by Ram Gopal Varma. The film is shot simultaneously in Hindi and Telugu languages, and stars Revathi. The music was composed by Mani Sharma. It is his debut film as music director. Raat was noted as an effort to bring horror films into mainstream Hindi cinema.

This was the final film released in Hindi, which was shot using 70mm negative. The film was critically acclaimed.

Plot 
A family of four moves into a house that is allegedly haunted. Manisha Sharma (Revathi) aka "Mini" is a girl studying in her college. Her father is Mr. Sharma  (Akash Khurana), while her mother is Shalini Sharma (Rohini Hattangadi). Deepak (Kushant) is Mini's classmate and boyfriend. Mini's nephew Bunty (Master Atit) finds a cat in the house basement. The cat has an eerie look on its face with its spot-staring eyes. One day the cat ventures behind the father's car rear wheel and is killed accidentally while the car is reversed. The cat is buried in the backyard without the knowledge of Bunty. Their neighbor, Nirmalamma, is also the grandmother to Rashmi, Mini's classmate. Nirmalamma spooks them with a fearful response after hearing Mini is their new neighbor.

Bunty finds another cat which bears an uncanny resemblance to the dead cat. The family gets its first shock. Another day, Mini and Deepak decide to enjoy a ride to the city limits. While returning home, Deepak's bike rear tire goes flat. Deepak rides with a passerby to get a spare tire from a village nearby and asks Mini to wait for him. On returning, Deepak finds Mini sitting beside a tree near a pond, clutching her face and apparently weeping. Approaching her, Deepak stares at her fierce, reddening eyes (resembling the dead cat eyes), and slips into the pond. All of a sudden, Mini turns normal and calls to Deepak to come out of the pond.

The next day, Mini attends her classmate Rashmi's friend's marriage accompanying her. Rashmi is brutally killed on that day, her neck broken and head turned all the way back. The police officer investigating the case notices that during interrogation, Mini twists her doll's head exactly the way Rashmi's neck was twisted. The officer then meets with an accident while riding out and dies. These events lead Mini's parents to seek professional help. Shalini approaches their neighbor, the old lady, while Mr. Sharma takes the help of a psychiatrist (Ananth Nag) regarding as nonsense the occult thoughts that his wife believes is the reason for their daughter's horror-stricken behavior. The neighbor old lady advises Shalini to seek the services of Sharji (Om Puri), who lives in Falaknuma. Sharji first visits his "guru" (Vijayachander) who has taken samadhi in the remote Falaknuma and gets fire-power ashes as a weapon. Sharji then locates the ghost (Sunanda) in Mini's house basement under the floor and finds it to be that of the woman who was the previous owner's mistress and who was murdered brutally. Later, while the killer is abed with his new paramour, the ghost of his former mistress kills him, as her hands and arms emerge from the bed and twist his neck, much like Rashmi's was done.

Following horrific events involving the ghost trying to kill Deepak, Sharji finally neutralizes her with the help of holy chants and the ashes. The ghost finally leaves Mini's body with a thundering flash.

On the one hand, scientific methods involving MRI and other medical procedures are conducted on Mini. This Mr. Sharma believes is the only way Mini could be "cured". However, Sharji has his own explanation of darkness beyond the light, that doesn't vanish, but is only diminished to an extent.

RGV has spun the web of horror played with confusion, dilemma, and the plight of the affected persons to the greatest extent possible, as required of a horror movie.

Cast 
Revathy as Manisha Sharma
Chinna as Deepak, Manisha's boyfriend
Rohini Hattangadi as Mrs. Sharma
Akash Khurana as Mr. Sharma
Om Puri as Sharji
Anant Nag as the psychiatrist
Master Atit as Bunty
Jaya Mathur as Rashmi
Nirmalamma as the old lady
Tej Sapru as the inspector
Sunanda as the spirit
C. V. L. Narasimha Rao

Music 
Background score for the film was composed by Mani Sharma.

Reception 
Upon release, N. Krishnaswamy of The Indian Express gave the film a positive review, calling it "technically superb" and writing that it "should be a reasonably tasty item in the horror film buff's menu card". In 2013, Amrah Ashraf of Hindustan Times called it the scariest film he had seen, saying Varma's Bhoot was a "subtler, sweeter remake of Raat". Suchitra Patnaik of Film Companion credits this film for changing the Indian horror film scene, stating: "It had actors pulling off stellar performances and a serene yet dramatic background score, making this 1992 movie a blockbuster hit."

See also 
 List of multilingual Indian films
 Pan-Indian film
 List of longest films in India

References

External links 

1990s supernatural horror films
Indian supernatural horror films
1992 horror films
1990s Hindi-language films
1992 films
Films directed by Ram Gopal Varma
1990s Telugu-language films
Indian multilingual films
Films scored by Mani Sharma